Single Petal of a Rose is an album by pianist John Hicks, recorded in 1992.

Recording and music
The album was recorded at Mapleshade Studio, Upper Marlboro, Maryland, in June 1992. The musicians were pianist John Hicks, flautist Elise Wood, bassist Walter Booker, and guest trumpeter Jack Walrath.

Release
Single Petal of a Rose was released by Mapleshade Records.

Reception

The Penguin Guide to Jazz observed that, "Working without percussion gives it all a very light, chamber-jazz feel, but there is enough substance to keep the level of interest high."

Track listing
 "Sometime Ago" (Sergio Mihanovich) – 5:20
 "Infant Eyes" (Wayne Shorter) – 8:45
 "Yes or No" (Shorter) – 4:14
 "Ballad of a Black Man" (David Murray) – 3:49
 "Ghosts of Yesterday" (Irene Higginbotham) – 4:30
 "Portraits" (Charles Mingus) – 5:59
 "Topaz" (Elise Wood) – 5:31
 "A Child Is Born" (Thad Jones, Alec Wilder) – 7:04
 "Single Petal of a Rose" (Duke Ellington, Billy Strayhorn) – 4:55
 "Embraceable You" (George Gershwin, Ira Gershwin) – 9:29
 "Virgo" (Shorter) – 5:25

Personnel
John Hicks – piano
Elise Wood – flute
Walter Booker – bass
Jack Walrath – trumpet

References

John Hicks (jazz pianist) albums